Malcolm K. Lee House is a historic home located at Monroe, Union County, North Carolina.  It was  built in 1919, and is a two-story, five bay, Colonial Revival style brick veneer dwelling with a slate covered hipped roof. It has two two-story, hipped-roofed rear wings forming a "U".  The front facade features a two-story, wooden portico supported by pairs of fluted columns with Greek Doric order capitals.

It was listed on the National Register of Historic Places in 1988.

References

Houses on the National Register of Historic Places in North Carolina
Colonial Revival architecture in North Carolina
Houses completed in 1919
Houses in Union County, North Carolina
National Register of Historic Places in Union County, North Carolina